Rhule is a surname. Notable people with the name include:

Matt Rhule (born 1975), American football coach
Raymond Rhule (born 1992), South African rugby union player

See also
Jacob Plange-Rhule (1957–2020), Ghanaian physician and academic
Rühle, surname
Rule (surname)